Amity Lane is a four-piece American alternative rock band from Montgomery, Alabama. The band features two former members from the gold-selling music group Trust Company, vocalist Kevin Palmer and bassist Josh Moates.

History
Amity Lane was formed in 2005 by Kevin Palmer and Josh Moates, both members of the gold selling music group Trust Company.

The band's debut album The Sound of Regret was released on October 31, 2006.

In 2007, Trust Company announced it was reuniting. It is unknown if Amity Lane will continue or disband.

Members
 Kevin Palmer – lead vocals, guitar
 Josh Moates – bass
 Jason Rash – noiseboards, samples, sounds
 Eric Salter - guitar

Discography

See also
 Trust Company

External links 
 Official site
 MySpace site
 PureVolume page
 CPR artist page
 

Alternative rock groups from Alabama
Musical groups established in 2005